PureBasic is a commercially distributed procedural computer programming language and integrated development environment based on BASIC and developed by Fantaisie Software for Windows, Linux, and macOS. An Amiga version is available, although it has been discontinued and some parts of it are released as open-source. The first public release of PureBasic for Windows was on 17 December 2000. It has been continually updated ever since.

PureBasic has a "lifetime license model". As cited on the website, the first PureBasic user (who registered in 1998) still has free access to new updates and this is not going to change.

PureBasic compiles directly to IA-32, x86-64, PowerPC or 680x0  instruction sets, generating small standalone executables and DLLs which need no runtime libraries beyond the standard system libraries. Programs developed without using the platform-specific application programming interfaces (APIs) can be built easily from the same source file with little or no modification.

PureBasic supports inline assembly, allowing the developer to include FASM assembler commands within PureBasic source code, while using the variables declared in PureBasic source code, enabling experienced programmers to improve the speed of speed-critical sections of code. PureBasic supports and has integrated the OGRE 3D Environment. Other 3D environments such as the Irrlicht Engine are unofficially supported.

Programming language

Characteristics 
PureBasic is a native cross platform 32 bit and 64 bit BASIC compiler. Currently supported systems are Windows, Linux, macOS. The AmigaOS version is legacy and open-source. The compiler produces native executables and the syntax of PureBasic is simple and straightforward, comparable to plain C without the brackets and with native unicode string handling and a large library of built-in support functions. It can compile console applications, GUI applications, and DLL files.

Hello World example 
The following single line of PureBasic code will create a standalone x86 executable (4.5 KiB (4,608 bytes) on Windows version) that displays a message box with the text "Hello World".
 MessageRequester("Message Box", "Hello World")

And the following variant of the same code, which instead uses an inline Windows API call with no need for declarations or other external references, will create an even smaller 2.0 KiB (2,048 bytes) standalone x86 executable for Windows.
 MessageBox_(0, "Hello World", "Message Box", 0)

The following is a console version of the Hello World example.
 OpenConsole()          ; Open a console window. 
 Print("Hello, World!")

Procedural programming 
PureBasic is a "Second generation BASIC" language, with structured conditionals and loops, and procedure-oriented programming supported.

Below is a sample procedure for sorting an array, although SortArray is now a built-in function of PureBasic.
 Procedure bubbleSort(Array a(1))
   Protected i, itemCount, hasChanged
  
   itemCount = ArraySize(a())
   Repeat
     hasChanged = #False
     itemCount - 1
     For i = 0 To itemCount
       If a(i) > a(i + 1)
         Swap a(i), a(i + 1)
         hasChanged = #True
       EndIf 
     Next  
   Until hasChanged = #False
 EndProcedure

Below is a sample program that displays a sizeable text editor with two menu items.
;Create Window:
OpenWindow(0, #PB_Ignore, #PB_Ignore, 800, 600, "Simple Text Editor", #PB_Window_SystemMenu | #PB_Window_MinimizeGadget | #PB_Window_MaximizeGadget | #PB_Window_SizeGadget)

;Add 2 menus:
CreateMenu(0, WindowID(0))
MenuItem(1, "&OK")
MenuItem(2, "&Cancel")

;Add Editor:
EditorGadget(0, 0, 0, 0, 0)
SetGadgetFont(0, LoadFont(0, "Courier New", 10))

;Process window messages until closed:
Repeat
    Select WaitWindowEvent()
    Case #PB_Event_Menu
        Select EventMenu()
        Case 1: MessageRequester("OK clicked directly or with '&' mnemonic.", GetGadgetText(0))
        Case 2: Break
        EndSelect
    Case #PB_Event_SizeWindow: ResizeGadget(0, 0, 0, WindowWidth(0, #PB_Window_InnerCoordinate), WindowHeight(0, #PB_Window_InnerCoordinate))
    Case #PB_Event_CloseWindow: Break
    EndSelect
ForEver

Object-oriented programming 
Fred, the developer of PureBasic, has stated that PureBasic will never be object oriented. However, numerous users have created object oriented support systems.

Data types 
Variable data type specified when you first use it (and optionally - in the future), and is separated from the name of the point. There is a set of basic types -  (float and double numbers),  (integers - from single-byte and 8-byte),  - strings.

 Note:  used to count the length of a string will not exceed the first null character.

In addition to basic types, the user can define the type of construction via
Structure type_name
   field_name.type ; Single field. Perhaps the structures attachment.
   field_name[count].type ; Static arrays.
   ; ... 
   ; Optional construction StructureUnion .. EndStructureUnion allows you
   ; to combine multiple fields into one area of memory
   ; that is sometimes required for the conversion types.
   StructureUnion
      type_name.type
      ; ... 
   EndStructureUnion 
EndStructure

Form Designer RAD 

PureBasic has its own form designer to aid in the creation of forms for applications, but other third-party solutions are also available. The original non-integrated Visual Designer was replaced with a new integrated Form Designer on 14 Feb 2013.

User community 
PureBasic provides an online forum for users to ask questions and share knowledge. On 6 May 2013 the English language forum had 4,769 members and contained 44,043 threads comprising 372,200 posts since 17 May 2002.

Numerous code sharing sites show PureBasic is used to create tools and games in a fast and easy way, and share large amounts of open-source code.

Further reading 
 
 This book is now freely downloadable

References

General references

External links 
 
Official Purebasic Forums (English)
 

Articles
   PureBasic - The Perfect Cross-Platform & Native Development Language (2015)
  A little PureBasic review (2019)

Libraries and Open Source Code Archives
  Andre Beer's Open Source PB code archive

BASIC compilers
BASIC programming language family
Programming languages
Programming languages created in 1998
1998 software
High-level programming languages
Procedural programming languages
Integrated development environments
User interface builders
macOS programming tools
Linux integrated development environments
Windows integrated development environments